Fire is one of the four classical elements along with earth, water and air in ancient Greek philosophy and science. Fire is considered to be both hot and dry and, according to Plato, is associated with the tetrahedron.

Greek and Roman tradition
Fire is one of the four classical elements in ancient Greek philosophy and science.  It was commonly associated with the qualities of energy, assertiveness, and passion.  In one Greek myth, Prometheus stole fire from the gods to protect the otherwise helpless humans, but was punished for this charity.

Fire was one of many archai proposed by the pre-Socratics, most of whom sought to reduce the cosmos, or its creation, to a single substance. Heraclitus   considered fire to be the most fundamental of all elements. He believed fire gave rise to the other three elements: "All things are an interchange for fire, and fire for all things, just like goods for gold and gold for goods." He had a reputation for obscure philosophical principles and for speaking in riddles. He described how fire gave rise to the other elements as the: "upward-downward path",, a "hidden harmony"  or series of transformations he called the "turnings of fire",, first into sea, and half that sea into earth, and half that earth into rarefied air. This is a concept that anticipates both the four classical elements of Empedocles and Aristotle's transmutation of the four elements into one another.
This world, which is the same for all, no one of gods or men has made. But it always was and will be: an ever-living fire, with measures of it kindling, and measures going out. 
Heraclitus regarded the soul as being a mixture of fire and water, with fire being the more noble part and water the ignoble aspect. He believed the goal of the soul is to be rid of water and become pure fire: the dry soul is the best and it is worldly pleasures that make the soul "moist". He was known as the "weeping philosopher" and died of hydropsy, a swelling due to abnormal accumulation of fluid beneath the skin.

However, Empedocles of Akragas  , is best known for having selected all elements as his archai and by the time of Plato , the four Empedoclian elements were well established. In the Timaeus, Plato's major cosmological dialogue, the Platonic solid he associated with fire was the tetrahedron which is formed from four triangles and contains the least volume with the greatest surface area. This also makes fire the element with the smallest number of sides, and Plato regarded it as appropriate for the heat of fire, which he felt is sharp and stabbing, (like one of the points of a tetrahedron).

Plato's student Aristotle  did not maintain his former teacher's geometric view of the elements, but rather preferred a somewhat more naturalistic explanation for the elements based on their traditional qualities. Fire the hot and dry element, like the other elements, was an abstract principle and not identical with the normal solids, liquids and combustion phenomena we experience:
 What we commonly call fire. It is not really fire, for fire is an excess of heat and a sort of ebullition; but in reality, of what we call air, the part surrounding the earth is moist and warm, because it contains both vapour and a dry exhalation from the earth.
According to Aristotle, the four elements rise or fall toward their natural place in concentric layers surrounding the center of the earth and form the terrestrial or sublunary spheres.

In ancient Greek medicine, each of the four humours became associated with an element. Yellow bile was the humor identified with fire, since both were hot and dry. Other things associated with fire and yellow bile in ancient and medieval medicine included the season of summer, since it increased the qualities of heat and aridity; the choleric temperament (of a person dominated by the yellow bile humour); the masculine; and the eastern point of the compass.

In alchemy the chemical element of sulfur was often associated with fire and its alchemical symbol and its symbol was an upward-pointing triangle. In alchemic tradition, metals are incubated by fire in the womb of the Earth and alchemists only accelerate their development.

Indian tradition

Agni is a Hindu and Vedic deity.  The word agni is Sanskrit for fire (noun), cognate with Latin ignis (the root of English ignite), Russian огонь (fire), pronounced agon. Agni has three forms: fire, lightning and the sun.

Agni is one of the most important of the Vedic gods. He is the god of fire and the accepter of sacrifices. The sacrifices made to Agni go to the deities because Agni is a messenger from and to the other gods. He is ever-young, because the fire is re-lit every day, yet he is also immortal. In Indian tradition fire is also linked to Surya or the Sun and Mangala or Mars, and with the south-east direction.

Ceremonial magic
Fire and the other Greek classical elements were incorporated into the Golden Dawn system.  Philosophus (4=7) is the elemental grade attributed to fire; this grade is also attributed to the Qabalistic Sephirah Netzach and the planet Venus. The elemental weapon of fire is the Wand. Each of the elements has several associated spiritual beings. The archangel of fire is Michael, the angel is Aral, the ruler is Seraph, the king is Djin, and the fire elementals (following Paracelsus) are called salamanders. Fire is considered to be active; it is represented by the symbol for Leo and it is referred to the lower right point of the pentacle in the Supreme Invoking Ritual of the Pentacle. Many of these associations have since spread throughout the occult community.

Tarot
Fire in tarot symbolizes conversion or passion.  Many references to fire in tarot are related to the usage of fire in the practice of alchemy, in which the application of fire is a prime method of conversion, and everything that touches fire is changed, often beyond recognition. The symbol of fire was a cue pointing towards transformation, the chemical variant being the symbol delta, which is also the classical symbol for fire. Conversion symbolized can be good, for example, refining raw crudities to gold, as seen in The Devil. Conversion can also be bad, as in The Tower, symbolizing a downfall due to anger. Fire is associated with the suit of rods/wands, and as such, represents passion from inspiration. As an element, fire has mixed symbolism because it represents energy, which can be helpful when controlled, but volatile if left unchecked.

Modern witchcraft
Fire is one of the five elements that appear in most Wiccan traditions influenced by the Golden Dawn system of magic, and Aleister Crowley's mysticism, which was in turn inspired by the Golden Dawn.

Freemasonry
In freemasonry, fire is present, for example, during the ceremony of winter solstice, a symbol also of renaissance and energy. Freemasonry takes the ancient symbolic meaning of fire and recognizes its double nature: creation, light, on the one hand, and destruction and purification, on the other.

See also
 Fire god
 Fire worship
 Pyrokinesis
 Pyromancy
 Pyromania

References

Further reading
 Frazer, Sir James George, Myths of the Origin of Fire, London: Macmillan, 1930.

External links

 Different versions of the classical elements
 Overview the 5 elements
 Section on 4 elements in Buddhism
 a virtual exhibition about the history of fire

Classical elements
Numerology
Esoteric cosmology
Fire in culture
Technical factors of astrology
History of astrology